Moorman is a census-designated place (CDP) located in Muhlenberg County, Kentucky, United States.

References

Census-designated places in Muhlenberg County, Kentucky
Census-designated places in Kentucky